Amen Bank is  a private sector bank in Tunisia. It is listed in the Bourse de Tunis.

Overview
Amen Bank was founded in 1966, as a result of the independence from the Crédit Foncier d'Algérie et de Tunisie (CFAT), a local branch of the French banking system Société Centrale de Banque (later known as Société Générale) established as far back as 1880 and headquartered in Algiers, Algeria. In 1966, it changed its name to Crédit Foncier et Commercial de Tunisie (CFCT). Its first CEO was Ismail Zouiten, yet all its shareholders were French citizens. In 1971, it was bought by the Banque Générale d'Investissement, later known as PGI Holding, and opened to Tunisian shareholders as Rachid Ben Yedder became the new CEO. In 1995, it changed its name again to Amen Bank.

In 2009, Amen Bank launched Tunisia's first online bank.

In 2015, Amen Bank launched Tunisia's first online direct bank. Amen Bank made a request to the Central Bank of Tunisia to create a subsidiary specialized in Islamic banking and finance.

Its headquarters is in Tunis, Tunisia.

See also
List of banks
List of banks in Tunisia

References

Banks established in 1966
Banks of Tunisia
1966 establishments in Tunisia
Economy of Tunis
Companies listed on the Bourse de Tunis